Hemaris fuciformis, known as the broad-bordered bee hawk-moth, is a moth of the family Sphingidae.

Distribution 
It is found in North Africa, Europe (except northern Scandinavia) and central and eastern Asia.

Description 
The moth flies from April to September depending on the location.
Hemaris fuciformis larvae.jpg|Figs, 3, 3a larvae after last moult 3b larva just before pupation 3c pupa
The larvae feed on honeysuckle and Galium species.

Subspecies
Hemaris fuciformis fuciformis
Hemaris fuciformis pseudodentata Dubatolov, 2003 (Kopetdagh Mountains)

Similar species
Compared to H. tityus, H. fuciformis has a much broader marginal band to the wings, and the forewing's discal cell is longitudinally divided by a fold.

References

External links

Broad-bordered bee hawk-moth UKMoths

Lepiforum e.V.
Vlindernet.nl 

F
Moths of Europe
Moths of Asia
Moths of Africa
Moths of Japan
Moths described in 1758
Taxa named by Carl Linnaeus